Basic Education High School No. 4 Dagon, is a public high school located in Yangon, Myanmar. The school was known as St. Luke's High School under the Taungoo Anglican Diocese until the 1960s when it was nationalized. The school offers classes from kindergarten to Tenth Standard (recently renamed Grade 1 to Grade 11).

High schools in Yangon